The Woman in Heaven (German:Die Frau im Himmel) is a 1920 German silent film directed by Johannes Guter and starring Lil Dagover and Werner Krauss.

The film's art direction was by Franz Seemann.

Cast
In alphabetical order
 Alfred Abel 
 Julius Brandt 
 Hans Brockmann 
 Helga Burger 
 Lil Dagover as Tatjana  
 Werner Krauss as Aufseher  
 Lothar Müthel as Feodor  
 Auguste Prasch-Grevenberg 
 Robert Scholz 
 Hermine Straßmann-Witt

References

Bibliography
 Hans-Michael Bock and Tim Bergfelder. The Concise Cinegraph: An Encyclopedia of German Cinema. Berghahn Books.

External links

1920 films
Films of the Weimar Republic
Films directed by Johannes Guter
German silent feature films
Films produced by Erich Pommer
Films set in Russia
German black-and-white films